Newborn is the eighth studio album by James Gang, released in 1975, and the only released on Atlantic Records.

Guitarist Tommy Bolin and singer Roy Kenner left the band, and were replaced by guitarist Richard Shack and vocalist Bubba Keith. This album is notable for being perhaps the most boogie-based James Gang release and for featuring a cover of the Elvis Presley classic "Heartbreak Hotel".

Both Newborn and its follow-up Jesse Come Home have been reissued on one CD by Wounded Bird Records.

The album cover artwork features a reproduction of Salvador Dalí's "Geopoliticus Child Watching the Birth of the New Man"

Critical reception

Writing for Allmusic, critic Stephen Thomas Erlewine wrote of the album "The record was another collection of mediocre songs—a problem that plagued the band ever since the departure of Joe Walsh in 1971."

Track listing
All songs by Bubba Keith and Richard Shack, except where noted.
Side One
 "Merry-Go-Round" – 3:05
 Bubba Keith - lead vocals, guitar
 Richard Shack - guitars, backing vocals, guitar solo
 Dale Peters - bass, backing vocals
 Jim Fox - drums
 David Briggs - organ
 "Gonna Get By" (Bubba Keith, Mark Smith) – 3:59
 Bubba Keith - lead vocals, acoustic guitar
 Richard Shack - electric guitar, backing vocals
 Dale Peters - bass, backing vocals
 Jim Fox - drums
 David Briggs - piano, organ
 "Earthshaker" (Keith) – 3:48
 Bubba Keith - lead vocals, guitar
 Richard Shack - guitars, guitar solo
 Dale Peters - bass
 Jim Fox - drums
 Tom Dowd - cacophony
 Ken Hamann - synth-A
 "All I Have" – 2:17
 Bubba Keith - lead vocals
 Richard Shack - guitar
 Dale Peters - bass
 "Watch It" (Keith) – 3:32
 Bubba Keith - lead vocals, guitar
 Richard Shack - guitars, guitar solo
 Dale Peters - bass, cowbell
 Jim Fox - drums
Side Two
 "Driftin' Dreamer" – 3:31
 Bubba Keith - lead vocals, acoustic guitar
 Richard Shack - electric guitar, backing vocals
 Dale Peters - bass, backing vocals, tambourine
 Jim Fox - drums, organ
 "Shoulda' Seen Your Face" – 3:46
 Bubba Keith - lead vocals, guitar
 Richard Shack - guitars, guitar solo
 Dale Peters - bass, triangle
 Jim Fox - drums
 "Come With Me" – 2:30
 Bubba Keith - lead vocals
 Richard Shack - guitar
 Donny Brooks - harmonica
 George Ricci - cello
 Arif Mardin - cello and harmonica arrangements
 "Heartbreak Hotel" (Mae Boren Axton & Tommy Durden) – 2:15
 Bubba Keith - lead vocals, guitar
 Richard Shack - guitars, guitar solo
 Dale Peters - bass
 Jim Fox - drums, piano
 "Red Satin Lover" – 2:17
 Bubba Keith - lead vocals, guitar
 Richard Shack - guitars, guitar solo
 Dale Peters - bass, backing vocals, tambourine
 Jim Fox - drums
 "Cold Wind" – 2:34
 Bubba Keith - lead vocals, acoustic guitar
 Richard Shack - electric guitar, guitar solo
 Dale Peters - bass
 Jim Fox - drums
 Al Perkins - steel guitar
 Tom Dowd - piano

Personnel 
 Bubba Keith – lead vocals, electric and acoustic guitars
 Richard Shack – electric guitars, backing vocals
 Dale Peters – bass, backing vocals, percussion
 Jim Fox – drums, organ, piano
 Al Perkins – steel guitar
 David Briggs – organ, piano
 Kenneth Hamann – synthesizer
 Don Brooks – harmonica
 George Ricci – cello

Sales chart performance
Album - Billboard (United States)

References

James Gang albums
1975 albums
Atlantic Records albums